Dr Gavin Brown Clark (1846 – 5 July 1930) was the MP for Caithness from 1885 to 1900.

He was educated at the University of Glasgow, the University of Edinburgh and King's College London, graduating in medicine.

An active campaigner for social reform issues against an official Liberal candidate, he joined the Crofters Party parliamentary group and gave general support to the Liberal Party, while in opposition. He was re-elected as the official Liberal candidate in 1886, 1892 and 1895.  Spending the time in opposition he spoke in the Commons in favour of measures to ameliorate poverty.  Crofters were hard-bitten in the far north of Scotland by the clearances, unemployment, and low wages.  He was the Honorary Secretary of the Transvaal Independence Committee, for which he wrote the pamphlet The Transvaal and Bechuanaland. For the 1900 general election he was replaced as Liberal candidate and defeated. He unsuccessfully stood for the Labour Party in Glasgow Cathcart in the 1918 general election.

References

External links 
 

1846 births
1930 deaths
UK MPs 1885–1886
UK MPs 1886–1892
UK MPs 1892–1895
UK MPs 1895–1900
Alumni of the University of Glasgow
Alumni of the University of Edinburgh
Alumni of King's College London
Scottish Liberal Party MPs
Crofters Party MPs
Members of the Parliament of the United Kingdom for Highland constituencies
Labour Party (UK) parliamentary candidates